The St. Louis Southwestern Railway (Cotton Belt Route) Relief Train is a railroad rescue and recovery train, its elements now on display at the Arkansas Railroad Museum in Pine Bluff, Arkansas.  The train's principal feature is a large steam crane (SSW 96005), built by Industrial Brownhoist of Bay City, Michigan in 1940.  Other elements of the train include a boom car, generator flat, kitchen car, tool car, and crew sleeper.  The boom car, a low gondola car, was attached to the train below the projecting section of the train; the other elements of the train supported the crew and the operation of the crane to clear derailments.  The relief train was assembled by the St. Louis Southwestern Railway (aka the Cotton Belt Run), and remained in active service until 1996, when it was given to the museum.

The train was listed on the National Register of Historic Places in 2007.

See also
National Register of Historic Places listings in Jefferson County, Arkansas

References

Arkansas Railroad Museum
Buildings and structures completed in 1940
National Register of Historic Places in Pine Bluff, Arkansas
Rail infrastructure on the National Register of Historic Places in Arkansas